A public bookcase (also known as a free library or street library or sidewalk library) is a cabinet which may be freely and anonymously used for the exchange and storage of books without the administrative rigor associated with formal libraries. When in public places these cabinets are of a robust and weatherproof design which are available at all times. However, cabinets installed in public or commercial buildings may be simple, unmodified book-shelves and may only be available during certain periods.

Origin 
Closely allied with the BookCrossing concept, the original public bookcases were conceived as artistic acts. Very early examples are the creations of performance artist duo Clegg & Guttmann in 1991. Collections of bookcases were conceived as "free open-air libraries" in Darmstadt and Hannover in Germany in the late 1990s.

In 2002, the Bonn Community Foundation awarded Trixy Royeck funding for her idea "outdoor books – books in the open" which she submitted while studying interior design in Mainz and since this time the concept has been widely replicated. A public bookcase opened in 2010 in Vienna, Austria. In Basel, Switzerland, where many coffee shops and other venues host open bookshelves, a public bookcase was unveiled in June 2011.

Open bookcases are financed by a wide range of organisations (individuals, foundations, Lions Clubs, civic associations, and so on). Visitors to the bookcases decide which books to deposit and borrow, and whether to return or exchange borrowed books for others.

Use and acceptance 
If a public bookcase is centrally and accessibly located and is stocked with sufficient material, public bookcases are quickly and widely appreciated. Vandalism has occurred in some places and, in successful cases, is countered by "bookcase sponsors" or "godfathers" who devote their time and attention to care of the collection.

The acceptance, motivation and user-profile of public bookshelves was examined in 2008 by a study at the University of Bonn. It was found that the system had developed as a notable alternative to conventional bookstores. One cannot equate public bookcases with classic peer-to-peer exchange, but they certainly represent the voluntary transfer of goods. Surveyed users also indicated that they believed that regular use of public bookcases could function as an example for similar schemes for other desirable goods. This acceptance has led to a rapid dissemination of public bookshelves throughout Germany. It has been found that durable construction and storm-resistance promote sustained use.

In North America, public bookcases have been criticized for being mostly placed redundantly in neighborhoods of wealthier well-educated people, where there are already high-quality traditional public libraries nearby.

Variants 

In Oerlinghausen there is a modified version of the public bookcase. A small bookcase has been installed in Simon Square by the Friends of The Public Library, in collaboration with the Cohabitation/Society/Culture group of the local Agenda 21. These groups stock the bookcase as needed from a so-called "book exchange", a larger public event which has taken place in the Dietrich-Bonhoeffer-Haus in Oerlingsausen-South every Saturday since 2007. One may also deposit book requests to be matched from stock by the operators of the exchange.

The Salbke Bookmark is a large, open-air construction which includes a number of public bookcases. Originally built on the site of a demolished library in a depopulated district of Magdeburg, the local civic association has moved much of the stock to a nearby vacant shop where more than 10000 donations are securely housed.

A cafe in Marburg includes a public bookcase. The city library now includes a cabinet of books which may be freely taken or exchanged by patrons rather than organising complex book disposal events. The operation of this variant combines the library's daily operations with community control. As the bookcase is located in a protected space it does not require sponsorship or weather protection.

Registries and mapping 
In North America small enclosed bookcases, usually in front of residences, have become a common sight in many cities. Some of these are purchased from or otherwise officially registered with Little Free Library, which was founded in 2009. In Australia, Street Library Australia operates along similar lines, while in Europe many public bookcases are registered via the Open Book Case project. The mapping project OpenStreetMap has a designated tag for registering the location types and more of public bookcases.

Gallery

See also
 Book sales club
 Book swapping
 Give-away shop
 Community fridge

References

External links

 Free application Delivrez is a participative & free project, also available for android platform
 List of public bookcases on German Wikipedia 
 A subset of Public bookcases presented on a map as part of the OpenBookCase.org project (archived 11 October 2019)
 Public bookcases map A map with public bookcases for book exchange. The map is based on OpenStreetMap data.

Book swapping
Bookcase
Types of library